Daniel H. La Botz (born August 9, 1945) is an American labor union activist, academic, journalist, and author. He was a co-founder of Teamsters for a Democratic Union (TDU) and has written extensively on worker rights in the United States and Mexico. He is a member of the socialist organization Solidarity, which describes itself as "a democratic, revolutionary socialist, feminist, anti-racist organization," which comes out of the Trotskyist tradition. La Botz ran in 2010 for a seat in the United States Senate for the Socialist Party. He is also a member of the Brooklyn branch of the Democratic Socialists of America and a co-editor of the socialist journal New Politics.

Early life and career 
La Botz was born in Chicago, Illinois but grew up outside San Diego, California. He attended Southwestern College and the University of California, San Diego. When he was in college, he opposed the American involvement in the Vietnam war and supported the United Farm Workers. He is a leader of the socialist organization Solidarity, which describes itself as "a democratic, revolutionary socialist, feminist, anti-racist organization" and which comes out of the Trotskyist tradition. In the 1970s, La Botz worked various jobs in Chicago before working as a truck driver. Within the International Brotherhood of Teamsters (IBT), he was a co-founder of the Teamsters for a Democratic Union (TDU), a reform caucus partially maintained by members of Solidarity. TDU began in 1975 when a small group of freight Teamsters, some from the International Socialists (IS) group in Berkeley, CA met in Chicago, Illinois and founded Teamsters for a Decent Contract (TDC). The IS later merged with other organizations from Trotskyist traditions to form Solidarity.

La Botz subsequently worked as a community and union organizer and later a journalist. La Botz worked in the 1980s as a journalist in Chicago and Mexico City and as an author on topics of workers' struggles and unions in the United States and Mexico. He earned a PhD in American history at the University of Cincinnati in 1998. He later became assistant professor of history and Latin American studies at the Miami University, the University of Cincinnati and the Northern Kentucky University. La Botz is an editor of Mexican Labor News and Analysis (MLNA). In May 2010, La Botz was working as a Spanish teacher at Waldorf elementary school in Cincinnati.

Senatorial campaign 

On February 19, 2010, La Botz announced that he was running for the United States Senate in Ohio on the Ohio Socialist Party ballot. He subsequently gathered 1,200 signatures to gain ballot access. La Botz was the only Ohio candidate running on the ticket of  the Socialist Party USA.

In the United States Senate election in Ohio, 2010, SPOH candidate La Botz received 25 thousand votes (0.68%); the Republican winner Rob Portman received 2.125 million votes (57.25%) and  the Democratic candidate Lee Fisher received 1.448 million votes (39.00%).

Published works

Books

Pamphlets

References

External links

 Interview with Dan La Botz by JK Fowler for The Mantle on March 19, 2011

1945 births
21st-century American historians
21st-century American male writers
American male journalists
Trade unionists from Ohio
Living people
Politicians from Cincinnati
Socialist Party USA politicians from Ohio
American truck drivers
University of California, San Diego alumni
University of Cincinnati alumni
Members of Solidarity (United States)
Members of the Democratic Socialists of America
Ohio socialists
California socialists
Illinois socialists
Historians from Ohio
American male non-fiction writers